Laudelino de Oliveira Freire (1873-1937) was a Brazilian lawyer, journalist, professor, politician, critic and philologist. 

He was born in Lagarto on January 26, 1873. He was a student at the Military School in Rio de Janeiro, though his course was interrupted due to illness. After graduating with a law degree, he worked in public service and in teaching. He also wrote for the papers, under the pseudonyms Lof and Wulf.

After serving three terms as State Deputy in the Legislative Assembly of Sergipe, he settled permanently in Rio de Janeiro. He was full professor at the Colégio Militar, where he taught a number of subjects. In Rio, he advanced his career as a writer, journalist and philologist. As a journalist, he ran the Gazeta de Notícias and wrote in several newspapers, including Jornal do Brasil, Jornal do Comércio and O País. He was also a noted researcher in the field of classical and philological studies in Brazil. In 1918 he founded the Revista da Língua Portuguesa, which he ran with great rigour and high intellectual standards. Its 68 published volumes are, to this day, an indispensable resource for anyone wishing to study the Portuguese language. He also founded and directed Estante Clássica (15 volumes). He was the author of the Grande e novíssimo dicionário da Língua Portuguesa, published posthumously in five volumes, with the collaboration of JL de Campos, Vasco Lima and Antônio Soares Franco Júnior. He was a forceful proponent of the simplification of spelling in Brazil. 

He was the second occupant of chair 10 of the Brazilian Academy of Letters, to which he was elected on November 16, 1923, succeeding Rui Barbosa, and received by academic Aloísio de Castro on March 22, 1924. He in turn received academic Aldemar Tavares.

He died in Rio de Janeiro on June 18, 1937.

References

1873 births
1937 deaths
Brazilian writers